FoolsFURY Theater is an ensemble theater company based in San Francisco.

Founded in 1998 by Artistic Director Ben Yalom, the company presents reworked Shakespeare and classical texts as well as new works by experimental contemporary playwrights. In 2020 Deborah Eliezer took over as artistic director. In 2021 FoolsFURY announced it was closing down.

History
"Foolsfury Theater" specialized in physical theater techniques such as Viewpoints, Suzuki, and Grotowski-based methods. They also were a training center for these theater techniques and ran a youth program, Swivel Arts.

The ensemble hosted a biennial festival of experimental theater called the "Fury Factory." The factory brought together ensemble companies from all around the country and different parts of the world. Past companies include Pig Iron, Banana Bag & Bodice, Witness Relocation, Under the Table and Hand2Mouth.

In 2015, associate artistic, Deborah Eliezer, became co-artistic director with Ben Yalom, and in 2020 she took over as Artistic Director.

In 2021 it was announced that foolsfury was to be closed down and work archived.

Affiliations
The company worked on new shows with playwrights such as Sheila Callaghan, Doug Dorst, and Fabrice Melquiot and collaborated with theatrical innovators such as SITI Company, Mary Overlie, Stephen Wangh and Corey Fischer.

References

External links
 

Theatre companies in San Francisco
Performing groups established in 1998